Wickwire is a surname. Notable people with the surname include:

Chester Wickwire (1913–2008), American civil rights activist
Harry H. Wickwire (1868–1922), Canadian lawyer and politician
Jim Wickwire (born 1940), American mountain climber
Nancy Wickwire (1925-1974), American actress